Christophe Roux (born 27 July 1983 in Switzerland) is an alpine skier representing Moldova.  He competed for Moldova at the 2010 Winter Olympics.  His best result was a 28th-place finish in the slalom.

References

External links

1983 births
Living people
Moldovan male alpine skiers
Olympic alpine skiers of Moldova
Alpine skiers at the 2010 Winter Olympics